Norrtäljeån is a river in Sweden. Sea trout are caught there.

References

External links

Rivers of Stockholm County